Concerning Women is a Canadian women's current affairs television series which aired on CBC Television in 1976.

Premise
This series was compiled in Vancouver from a selection of broadcasts from that city and from Halifax and Ottawa. Subjects included children's views of women, women's mental health, single women, women in sports and a profile of 57 women Alcan smelter employees at Kitimat, British Columbia. Concerning Women was produced in recognition of International Women's Year.

Scheduling
This half-hour series was broadcast Sundays at 12:30 p.m. (Eastern) from 23 May to 12 September 1976.

References

External links
 

CBC Television original programming
1976 Canadian television series debuts
1976 Canadian television series endings
Television shows filmed in Vancouver